Rashid Al-Dosari (Arabic: راشد الدوسري; born on March 24, 1980) is a Bahraini footballer.

Club career
At the club level, Al-Dosari plays as a midfielder for the Muharraq Club .

International career
He is also a member of the Bahrain national football team.

External links

Bahraini footballers
Bahraini expatriates in Qatar
Al-Khor SC players
Al-Arabi SC (Qatar) players
Al-Muharraq SC players
2004 AFC Asian Cup players
2007 AFC Asian Cup players
1978 births
Living people
Footballers at the 2002 Asian Games
Qatar Stars League players
Association football midfielders
Asian Games competitors for Bahrain
Bahrain international footballers